The Copa Pachuca, sometimes referred to as La Cuna de Futbol is a short tournament in preparation for the Primera División de México. La Copa Pachuca is always held in C.F. Pachuca's stadium, which has been the Estadio Hidalgo.

History

Copa Pachuca has had XIX issues, and has become the most important tournament in the Mexican Football Preseason. The first edition of this tournament was played in August 1994, and since then this competition has served to reinforce its guests club's preseason. Notably, in the first edition of Copa Pachuca it managed to involve 3 so-called "big teams" of the Primera División de México Club America, Cruz Azul, and Pumas; thus beginning the history and tradition of the most important Mexican preseason tournament.

Format 
Copa Pachuca is actually a very quick preparation tournament where each participating team only gets to play two games. The tournament starts in the semi-final round at the start with only one legged games. The two teams that win their first game move onto the final. The two teams that lose their first game play a game against each other for third place. All games are treated like playoff games. In case of a tie, the two teams will move onto penalties.

Results

 * winner determined by penalty shoot-out

Champions 

 * means that the team has no yet been a champion (but they are included for having reached the final)
 more teams have participated in Copa Pachuca yet are not included in the list above for not have reached the final

References
https://archive.today/20000229104930/http://www.senorgol.nu/mexico/futmexsub.htm
http://www.rsssf.com/tablesp/pachucacuna.html

 
Football competitions in Mexico
C.F. Pachuca
1999 establishments in Mexico